Leonid Kostandov (27 November 1915 – 5 September 1984) was a Soviet engineer and politician who served as the minister of the chemical industry between 1965 and 1980 and as the deputy premier from 1980 to his death.

Biography

Being a native of Kerki, Turkmenistan, Kostandov was born on 27 November 1915 into an ethnic Armenian family. He started his career in a local cotton gin and then in a silk-weaving mill in 1930. He graduated from the Moscow Institute of Chemical Engineering in 1940. He joined the Communist Party of the Soviet Union in 1942. Following his graduation he began to work as a manager in a chemical plant in Chirchik. In 1951 he was awarded a Stalin Prize. He was appointed to the central administration of the chemical industry in Moscow in 1953. He was named as the minister of the chemical industry in October 1965 and remained in the post in 1980. The same year he was appointed deputy prime minister responsible for chemical and related industries.

Kostandov died of a heart attack on 5 September 1984 while he was visiting a fair in Leipzig, East Germany. He was buried in the Kremlin Wall Necropolis after the official funeral ceremony held in Red Square, Moscow.

References

External links

20th-century Russian engineers
1915 births
1984 deaths
Burials at the Kremlin Wall Necropolis
Central Committee of the Communist Party of the Soviet Union members
Moscow Institute of Chemical Engineering alumni
People's commissars and ministers of the Soviet Union
Seventh convocation members of the Soviet of Nationalities
Eighth convocation members of the Soviet of Nationalities
Ninth convocation members of the Soviet of Nationalities
Tenth convocation members of the Soviet of Nationalities
Eleventh convocation members of the Soviet of Nationalities
Stalin Prize winners
Lenin Prize winners
People from Lebap Region
Recipients of the Order of Lenin
Recipients of the Order of the Red Banner of Labour
Russian people of Armenian descent
Russian engineers
Soviet chemical engineers